The 2017–18 Azerbaijan Premier League was the 26th season of the Azerbaijan Premier League. The season began on 11 August 2017 and ended on 19 May 2018.

Although unconfirmed by UEFA, it was expected that the winners of the league this season would earn a spot in the first qualifying round of the 2018–19 UEFA Champions League, and the second and third placed clubs would earn a place in the first qualifying round of the 2018–19 UEFA Europa League.

Qarabağ were the defending champions.

Teams
Shuvalan was relegated at the conclusion of the previous season. Sabail were promoted and will participate in the Premier League this season.

Stadia and locations
Note: Table lists in alphabetical order.

Stadiums

Personnel and kits

Note: Flags indicate national team as has been defined under FIFA eligibility rules. Players may hold more than one non-FIFA nationality.

Managerial changes

League table

Results
Clubs will play each other four times for a total of 28 matches each.

Games 1–14

Games 15–28

Season statistics

Top scorers

Top assists

Clean sheetsUpdated to matches played on 21 May 2018.''

Scoring
 First goal of the season: Mahir Madatov for Qarabağ against Neftçi Baku. (11 August 2017)
 Fastest goal of the season: 26th second, 
 Bagaliy Dabo for Gabala against Kapaz (25 November 2017)

See also
 Azerbaijan Premier League

References

External links
UEFA

2017–18 in European association football leagues
2017–18
1